= Shekhe Pind =

Sheikhe Pind
- Village
- Location within Punjab
- Coordinates: 31.367°N 75.625°E
- Country: India
- State: Punjab
- District: Jalandhar
- Subdistrict: Jalandhar

Population (2011)
  - Total: 487
- Time zone: UTC+05:30 (IST)

Shekhe Pind is a village located by the old Hoshiarpur road near Lamba Pind in Jalandhar district of Punjab, India. As per the last 2011 Indian census, the population of district is 487. Most of the people migrated from Pakistan region post partition. Most of the population of the village is Sikhs. There are three gurudwaras in this village. The village is situated 7 km away from sub-district headquarter Jalandhar - I (tehsildar office) and 7 km away from district headquarter Jalandhar. The pin code of the village is 030344. Most prosperous people in village are from sc and Kamboj and Jat Sikh. Also a lot of people are living abroad.
